YCT529 is a drug which acts as a potent and selective antagonist of the Vitamin A receptor retinoic acid receptor alpha (RAR-α). In studies on mice it produced a 99% reduction in sperm production, and it has proceeded to early stage human clinical trials as a potential male contraceptive.

See also 
 Adjudin
 Dimethandrolone undecanoate
 JQ1
 TDI-11861

References 

Contraception for males
Experimental methods of birth control
Pyrroles
Benzoic acids
Benzopyrans